A hybrid shipping container is a shipping system that uses the energy of phase-change material (PCM) in combination with the ability to recharge without removing the media. This ability is known as "cold-energy battery".

Currently, this technology is only being used in a limited number of shipping containers.

 SkyCell - high energy protection
 va-Q-tec - high energy protection combined with vacuum panels
 TOWER - very limited energy protection
 Peli BioThermal - high energy protection 
 World Courier Cocoon - similar platform to va-Q-tec

A Cold-energy battery works by storing energy to a given temperature and using its thermal mass to maintain this temperature. It can be recharged by being placed in a temperature range applicable to its phase change window.

References

Shipping containers